Irina Smolnikova (born 21 July 1980) is a Kazakh long-distance runner. She competed in the marathon at the 2015 World Championships and 2016 Olympics.

References

1980 births
Living people
Kazakhstani female long-distance runners
Place of birth missing (living people)
World Athletics Championships athletes for Kazakhstan
Athletes (track and field) at the 2016 Summer Olympics
Olympic athletes of Kazakhstan
21st-century Kazakhstani women